Fu Zuoyi (June 2, 1895 − April 19, 1974) was a Chinese military leader. He began his military career in the service of Yan Xishan, and he was widely praised for his defense of Suiyuan from the Japanese. During the final stages of the Chinese Civil War, Fu surrendered the large and strategic garrison around Beiping to Communist forces. He later served in the government of the People's Republic of China as Minister of the Hydraulic Ministry.

Biography

Early military career
Fu began his career as an officer in Yan Xishan's Shanxi army. He served with distinction during the 1927–1928 Northern Expedition, after Yan declared his allegiance to the Kuomintang. Fu fought for Yan in the 1929–1930 Central Plains War, when Yan attempted to form a central government with himself as president. Yan's forces were easily routed by the forces of Chiang Kai-shek, and Yan was forced to live for a short period in exile.

Defense of Suiyuan
After Yan returned to Shanxi in 1931, Fu led Yan Xishan's efforts to "colonize" and take control over the Inner Mongolian province of Suiyuan. Most of the work and settlement of Suiyuan at this time was done by Shanxi farmer-soldiers under Fu's direction. Fu cultivated a close relationship with Zhang Xueliang in order to increase the legitimacy of Yan's control over Suiyuan.

In March 1936, Manchukuo troops occupying Chahar invaded northeastern Suiyuan, contesting Fu's control.  These Japanese-aligned troops seized the city of Bailingmiao in northern Suiyuan, where the pro-Japanese Inner Mongolian Autonomous Political Council maintained its headquarters. Three months later, the head of the Political Council, Prince Teh (Demchugdongrub) declared that he was the ruler of an independent Mongolia (Mengguguo), and organized an army with the aid of Japanese equipment and training. In August 1936 Prince Teh's army attempted to invade eastern Suiyuan, but it was defeated by Yan's forces under the command of Fu Zuoyi.  Following this defeat, Prince Teh planned another invasion while Japanese agents carefully sketched and photographed Suiyuan's defenses.

In November 1936 the army of Prince Teh presented Fu Zuoyi with an ultimatum to surrender.  When Fu responded that Prince Teh was merely a puppet of "certain quarters" and requested that Teh submit to the authority of the central government, Prince Teh's armies launched another, more ambitious attack. Teh's 15,000 soldiers were armed with Japanese weapons, supported by Japanese aircraft, and often led by Japanese officers. (Japanese soldiers fighting for Mengguguo were often executed by Fu after their capture as illegal combatants, since Mengguguo was not recognized as being part of Japan).

In anticipation of the Second Sino-Japanese War, Japanese spies destroyed a large supply depot in Datong and carried out other acts of sabotage. In order to defend Suiyuan, Yan placed his best troops and most able generals, including Zhao Chengshou and Yan's son-in-law, Wang Jingguo, under Fu's command. During the month of fighting that ensued, the army of Mengguguo suffered severe casualties.  Fu's forces succeeded in occupying Bailingmiao on November 24, 1936, and was considering invading Chahar before he was warned by the Kwangtung Army that doing so would provoke an attack by the Japanese Army. Prince Teh's forces repeatedly attempted to retake Bailingmiao, but this only provoked Fu into sending troops north, where he successfully seized the last of Teh's bases in Suiyuan and virtually annihilated his army.  After Japanese were found to be aiding Teh, Yan publicly accused Japan of aiding the invaders. Fu's victories in Suiyuan over Japanese-backed forces were praised by Chinese newspapers and magazines, other warlords and political leaders, and many students and members of the Chinese public. Fu's victories in Suiyuan greatly increased his prestige, and the prestige of Yan Xishan.

Defense against the Communists and Japanese
During the Second Sino-Japanese War, Fu held numerous commands in North China. As Commander of 7th Army Group he fought in Operation Chahar, the Battle of Taiyuan and the 1939–1940 Winter Offensive, in which he was responsible for winning the Battle of Wuyuan.  Fu ended the war as Commander of the 12th War Area, comprising Jehol, Chahar, and Suiyuan.

During the Chinese Civil War, Fu's forces (500,000 men) controlled the critically important Suiyuan-Peiping Corridor that separated Manchuria from China proper. After the Communists captured the Manchurian provinces in late 1948, Communists infiltrated Fu's inner circle and pressured Fu to negotiate a peaceful solution for the inevitable Communist take over.  At the same time, Fu became increasingly disillusioned with Chiang. Fu's personal estrangement from Chiang reaching a climax in October 1948, when Chiang suddenly withdrew from a critical meeting on the defense of territory under Fu's command without giving any immediate explanation.

The circumstances for Chiang's sudden departure were not discovered until later. Sometime earlier Chiang's son, Chiang Ching-kuo, had arrested and refused to release his cousin, Kung Ling-kan (孔令侃), as part of a broader effort to punish economic and financial criminals.  Realizing that her nephew could be executed for his crimes, and that Chiang Ching-kuo was highly likely to execute Kong to set an example, Soong Mei-ling begged her husband Chiang Kai-shek to fly immediately to Shanghai to rescue Kung.  Chiang Kai-shek agreed to save Kong, and left in the middle of the most important stage of defensive planning. Chiang's sudden departure was a great blow to Nationalist morale and left an impression on Fu and many other Nationalist commanders that Chiang had placed the welfare of his family above the welfare of the nation.

Communist agents active within Fu's inner circle included Fu's own daughter, Fu Dongju (傅冬菊), and Fu's most trusted personal secretary, Major General  (閻又文), who was from the same hometown as Fu (Ronghe, in Yuncheng). Fu Dongju, Yan Youwen, and other agents pressured Fu to surrender and repeatedly passed vital intelligence to the Communists. Fu began secret negotiations with Lin Biao, in which he arranged the surrender of the Beiping garrison, totaling a quarter of a million men, on January 31, 1949. Yan Youwen acted as Fu's representative during Fu's communication with Lin, but Fu did not know the true allegiance of Yan until after the establishment of the People's Republic of China.

Life in Communist China
Fu’s contributions to the Communist Party of China's success were rewarded with high posts, including the Minister of Hydraulics, which he kept until 1972, as well as posts in the Chinese People's Political Consultative Conference. During the Cultural Revolution (1966–1975) Fu was part of a list of people drafted by Zhou Enlai and approved by Mao to be protected, and was moved to Jingxi Hotel for safeguarding. Fu's daughter, Fu Dong was not impacted by the upheaval as well. 

In 1982, Fu Dong became assistant chief editor of Xinhua News Agency's Hong Kong branch. She retired in 1995. She died in 2007.

Military career: important dates
1928–1929  General Officer Commanding Tientsin Garrison Command
1929–1930  General Officer Commanding 10th Army
1930–1932  General Officer Commanding 35th Army
1931–1946  Chairman of the Government Suiyuan Province
1933–1941  Commander in Chief 7th Army Group
1937–1941  General Officer Commanding 35th Corps
1938   Commander in Chief Northern Route Force, 2nd War Area
1939–1945  Deputy Commander in Chief 8th War Area
1945   Commander in Chief 12th War Area
1945–1947  Director of Kalgan Pacification Headquarters
1946–1947  Chairman of the Government of Chahar Province
1947–1948  Commander in Chief General Headquarters for Bandit Suppression in North China

References

Citations

Sources 
 Gillin, Donald G.  Warlord: Yen Hsi-shan in Shansi Province 1911–1949.  Princeton, New Jersey: Princeton University Press.  1967.
 
 Chinese generals, Fu Zuoyi

External links

1895 births
1974 deaths
Politicians from Yuncheng
National Revolutionary Army generals from Shanxi
People's Republic of China politicians from Shanxi
Chinese people of World War II
Recipients of the Order of Blue Sky and White Sun
Chinese Communist Party politicians from Shanxi
Republic of China politicians from Shanxi
People of the Central Plains War
Delegates to the 1st National People's Congress
Delegates to the 2nd National People's Congress
Delegates to the 3rd National People's Congress
Members of the 3rd Chinese People's Political Consultative Conference
Members of the 4th Chinese People's Political Consultative Conference
Members of the 1st Chinese People's Political Consultative Conference
Members of the 2nd Chinese People's Political Consultative Conference
People of the Northern Expedition
People of the 1911 Revolution
Republic of China people who surrendered to the Chinese Communist Party
Vice Chairpersons of the National Committee of the Chinese People's Political Consultative Conference
Burials at Babaoshan Revolutionary Cemetery